Jean-Luc Bezoky (born 6 July 1966) is a Malagasy boxer. He competed in the men's featherweight event at the 1984 Summer Olympics.

References

1966 births
Living people
Malagasy male boxers
Olympic boxers of Madagascar
Boxers at the 1984 Summer Olympics
Place of birth missing (living people)
Featherweight boxers